Fet-Mats ("Fat Mats" real name: Mats Israelsson) (died 1677) was a natural mummy found in Sweden in 1719.

In 1719, miners in the Falun copper mine found an intact dead body in a water-filled, long-unused tunnel. When the body was put on display, it was identified by his former fiancée, Margaret Olsdotter, as Fet-Mats Israelsson, who had disappeared 42 years earlier.

Discovery

On December 2, 1719, miners discovered a dead man in the water-filled shaft known as Mårdskinnsfallet, in a part of the mine that had not been used for a long time. Both legs of the dead man were amputated and missing, but neither clothes, hands nor face showed signs of decay, which made it appear as if he had recently died; the find became a mystery because no person was reported as missing. When the body was raised to ground level, it began to dry and became "hard as wood" according to a contemporary description. According to others, the body had rather turned into stone, giving rise to the epithet "the petrified miner".

After the body was put on display in Stora Kopparberget, Margaret Olsdotter identified it as belonging to Fet-Mats Israelsson, her fiancé who disappeared in March 1677.  Local oral historians say a second woman also claimed to be his fiancée, but this could have been motivated by the benefits paid to miner's widows.

When the naturalist Carl Linnaeus visited, he noticed that Fet-Mats was not petrified but just covered with vitriol, a substance now commonly known as the pesticide copper sulfate.

Linnaeus stated that as soon as the vitriol evaporated, the body would begin to decay. That proved to be correct.

However, Fet-Mats Israelsson's body remained on display for 30 years, until he was buried in Stora Kopparberg Church on December 21, 1749. During renovation of the floor in the early 1860s, the remains of Fet-Mats were found again and exhibited in a display case, until he was finally buried in 1930 in the church's graveyard.

Fet-Mats in culture

Fet-Mats became an inspiration for the German romanticists. The  philosopher and naturalist Gotthilf Heinrich von Schubert wrote about him in Ansichten von der Nachtseite der Naturwissenschaft, Achim von Arnim wrote a ballad about Fet-Mats, Johann Peter Hebel wrote a short story about him called Unverhofftes Wiedersehen (Unexpected Reunion). Friedrich Rückert also wrote about Fet-Mats. Most notably E.T.A. Hoffmann wrote the short story Die Bergwerke zu Falun published in his collection Die Serapionsbrüder in 1819. In 1842 Richard Wagner wrote a libretto based on Hoffmann's short story called Die Bergwerke zu Falun, but it was refused and instead he wrote Tannhäuser. In 1901 Hugo von Hofmannsthal's Das Bergwerk zu Falun had a premiere in Vienna.

References

Sources
Fet-Mats
Fet-Mats
Richard Wagner och Falun

Mummies
1677 deaths
17th-century Swedish people
Year of birth unknown
1719 in Sweden